Noblesse is a term used in Scottish nobility.

Noblesse may also refer to:
 Noblesse (cigarette), a brand of cigarette
 Noblesse (horse), a racehorse
 Noblesse (manhwa), a South Korean webtoon

See also 
 Noblesse Oblige (disambiguation)